{{speciesbox
| image = Lipinia-vittigera-striped-tree-skink-lizard-khao-yai-national-park.jpg
| status = LC
| status_system = IUCN3.1
| status_ref =
| genus = Lipinia
| species = vittigera
| authority = (Boulenger, 1894)
| synonyms = Lygosoma vittigerum Boulenger, 1894Lygosoma pulchellum ANNANDALE 1905Leiolopisma pranensis COCHRAN 1930Lygosoma vittigerum SWORDER 1933Leiolopisma vittigerum vittigerum SMITH 1935Leiolopisma vittigerum vittigerum TAYLOR 1963Lipinia vittigera GREER 1974: 11Lipinia vittigera MANTHEY & GROSSMANN 1997Lipinia cf. vittigera TEO & RAJATHURAI 1997Lipinia vittigera COX et al. 1998: 116Lipinia vittigera DAS & AUSTIN 2007Lipinia vittigerum microcercum' BOETTGER 1901
Lygosoma (Leiolopisma) microcercum BOETTGER 1901
Lygosoma vittigerum kronfanum SMITH 1922
Leiolopisma vittigerum microcercum TAYLOR 1963
Lygosoma (Scincella) vittigerum vittigerum GRANDISON 1972
Lipinia vittigerum microcercum BOBROV 1995
Lipinia vittigera microcerca BOBROV & SEMENOV 2008
Lipinia vittigera microcercum GROSSMANN 2010
}}

The banded lipinia, Sipora striped skink or common striped skink (Lipinia vittigera''')  is a species of skink in the genus of Lipinia native to Myanmar, Thailand, Vietnam, Malaysia, Singapore and Cambodia.

References

Reptiles of Borneo
Reptiles of Myanmar
Reptiles of Thailand
Reptiles of Cambodia
Reptiles of Vietnam
Lipinia
Reptiles described in 1894
Taxa named by George Albert Boulenger